Thomas Kammerlander (born February 13, 1990) is an Austrian luger who has competed since 2006. A natural track luger, he won a silver medal in the men's singles event at the 2009 FIL World Luge Natural Track Championships in Moos, Italy.

Kammerlander also won two medals at the FIL European Luge Championships 2010 in St. Sebastian, Austria with a gold in the mixed team and a silver in the men's singles events.

References
 FIL-Luge profile

External links

 

1990 births
Living people
Austrian male lugers